is a former Nippon Professional Baseball infielder.

External links

1969 births
Living people
Baseball people from Yamanashi Prefecture
Japanese baseball players
Nippon Professional Baseball infielders
Hanshin Tigers players
Chunichi Dragons players
Nippon Professional Baseball Rookie of the Year Award winners
Japanese baseball coaches
Nippon Professional Baseball coaches